Pardon Chinungwa (born 28 October 1983) is a retired Zimbabwean football defender.

References

1983 births
Living people
Zimbabwean footballers
Masvingo United F.C. players
Gunners F.C. players
Triangle United F.C. players
ZPC Kariba F.C. players
Zimbabwe international footballers
Association football defenders
Zimbabwe Premier Soccer League players